Grassy (meaning 'covered with grass' or 'resembling grass') may refer to:

Populated places
Grassy, Lauderdale County, Alabama, an unincorporated community 
Grassy, Marshall County, Alabama, an unincorporated community 
Grassy, Missouri, unincorporated community in western Bollinger County, Missouri, United States
Grassy, Tasmania, small town on King Island in the Australian state of Tasmania

Geographical features
Grassy Cove, enclosed valley in Cumberland County, Tennessee, in the southeastern United States
Grassy Hill, the tenth highest hill in Hong Kong
Grassy Island, small, uninhabited 72-acre (29 ha) American island in the Detroit River
Grassy Key, island in the middle Florida Keys
Grassy Lake Dam, small dam operated by the U.S. Bureau of Reclamation in Teton County, Wyoming
Grassy Range, mountain range in Jackson County, Oregon
Grassy Ridge, ridge in the Blue Ridge Mountains in the U.S. state of Georgia

Other uses 
 Grassy, a wine taste descriptor

See also
Grassi
De Grassi (disambiguation)
Di Grassi

vo:Grassy